Joseph Nicholi Puryear (1973 – October 27, 2010) was an American mountain climber.

Early life
Puryear was born in 1973 to Gail and Shirley Puryear and was raised on their winery in Yakima Valley, Washington. In his youth, he took up carpentry, winemaking and farm work, and developed an interest in mountain climbing after his parents took him to Mount Adams when he was fifteen. He attended the University of Washington, where he earned a degree in mathematics.

Mountaineering
Beginning in 1996, Puryear worked for four seasons as a climbing ranger at Mount Rainier National Park, where he met fellow ranger Mark Westman. Puryear and Westman climbed together in the North Cascades, Yosemite National Park, Patagonia, and most frequently, the Alaska Range. In Alaska, they made ascents of Mount McKinley's south buttress and Cassin Ridge (2000) and Mount Foraker's Infinite Spur (2001). Puryear's other achievements in the Alaska Range included the first ascent of the Black Crystal Arête route on the Kichatna Spire, the Goldfinger route on the Stump, the Harvard Route on Mount Huntington, the Mount Silverthrone's west face, and the first speed ascent of Mount Barill via the Cobra Pillar. Using his own photographs and graphic design, and based on 30 ascents and a decade's worth of climbing in the region, Puryear wrote a guidebook to the Alaska Range, which was published by SuperTopo in 2006. Shortly afterwards, he was hired by Sherpa Adventure Gear as a photographer and the editor of their product catalog, which allowed him to finance his climbing trips after leaving his job at the National Park Service.

Puryear began climbing in the Himalayas in 2003, attracting sponsorship from companies and winning a climbing grant to support his attempts to ascend unclimbed mountains in China and Nepal. Over seven years, he made seven trips to the Himalayas. In China, he and Chad Kellogg made the first ascents of Lara Shan, Mount Daogou and the Angry Wife; in Nepal, he and David Gottlieb made the first ascents of Kang Nachugo, Takargo and Jobo Rinjang.

Death on Labuche Kang
In October 2010, Puryear and Gottlieb traveled to Tibet to climb Labuche Kang, a remote mountain in the Himalayas. While he was climbing unroped on the mountain, on October 27 Puryear broke through a cornice and fell  to his death. At the time of his death, the Seattle Times referred to Puryear as "one of the country's most elite alpinists".

Personal life
Puryear met Michelle O'Neil at Mount McKinley in 2001, and they married on the Pika Glacier of the Alaska Range in 2004. Puryear and O'Neil lived in Leavenworth, Washington.

References

1973 births
2010 deaths
American mountain climbers
Mountaineering deaths
Sportspeople from Yakima, Washington
University of Washington College of Arts and Sciences alumni
People from Leavenworth, Washington